Adrien Pressemane was a French politician and journalist. He was the chief editor of Le Populaire du Centre.

Work
Pressemane worked as a Saint-Léonard-de-Noblat porcelain painter before serving in parliament for the district. An Haute-Vienne mayor for ten years (1919-1929) and Député for eighteen years (1910-1928), he was the leader of a pacifist trend during World War One. A Guesdist, he worked with Guesde in the French Workers' Party (Parti Ouvrier Français, POF). He teamed up with Leon Betoulle on issues related to the success of French Section of the Workers' International (Section Française de l'Internationale Ouvrière, SFIO). He tried to avoid the collapse of the SFIO at the 1920 Tours Congress, but the aftermath was the creation of the French Communist Party. His speech at the 2nd World Congress of the Comintern of 1920 demonstrated his lack of commonality with the Third International.

References

External links
 Parti socialiste S. F. I. O.: Inauguration du monument Adrien Pressemane, député de la Haute Vienne (1937)

French Section of the Workers' International politicians
French editors
Year of birth missing
Year of death missing
French male writers